The Adolphe Muzito cabinet consists of the Ministers of State, Ministers and Vice-Ministers that form the government of the Democratic Republic of the Congo under Prime Minister Adolphe Muzito, who took office on 10 October 2008.

First Cabinet

The first cabinet was announced on 26 October 2008. 
There were three deputy prime ministers, 37 ministers and 14 deputy ministers. 
Eight ministers from the former team remained at their posts, others were swapped and 16 new members entered the cabinet.

Deputy Prime Ministers

Ministers

Deputy Ministers

Second Cabinet

On 20 February 2010 Joseph Kabila reshuffled the cabinet. Adolphe Muzito was retained as Prime Minister and Francois Joseph Nzanga Mobutu kept his post as Deputy Prime Minister and Minister of Employment, Labor and Welfare.
The number of members of government was reduced from 54 to 43.

François-Joseph Nzanga Mobutu was fired in March 2011.
Bernard Biondo, Minister of External Trade and a member of Mobutu's UDEMO party, resigned in solidarity. 
Minister of Rural Development Philippe Undji was fired and jailed for embezzlement.
In September 2011, the Decentralization Minister Antipas Mbusa Nyamwisi resigned to run for president.
A minor cabinet reshuffle was announced on 11 September 2011.
The Ministry of Decentralization was abolished.
Jean-Pierre Daruwezi became head of the National Intelligence Agency, and Louis Alphonse Daniel Koyagialo Ngbase te Gerengbo became Deputy Prime Minister and Minister of PTT.
Other appointments were Jean-Pierre Daruwezi as Minister of Economy, Justin Kalumba Mwana Ngongo as Minister of External Trade and
Charles Alulea Mengulwa as Minister Rural Development.

The cabinet announced on 20 February, with changes as of 11 September 2011 were:

Deputy Prime Ministers

Ministers

Vice-Ministers

See also
Antoine Gizenga cabinet

References

Government of the Democratic Republic of the Congo
Government ministers of the Democratic Republic of the Congo
2008 in the Democratic Republic of the Congo
Cabinets of the Democratic Republic of the Congo
Cabinets established in 2008
2008 establishments in the Democratic Republic of the Congo
Cabinets disestablished in 2012
2012 disestablishments in Africa